Craig Lewis (born 28 October 1986) is an Irish cricketer. He made his Twenty20 cricket debut for Northern Knights in the 2017 Inter-Provincial Trophy on 26 May 2017.

References

External links
 

1986 births
Living people
Irish cricketers
Northern Knights cricketers
Place of birth missing (living people)